Don Thorsen (born 1955 in Turlock, California) is an American scholar and writer. Thorsen has served at Azusa Pacific Seminary since 1988. In addition to being widely published, Thorsen travels internationally, presenting on various theological topics. He has been a contributing editor to Christianity Today, Light and Life, and Christian Scholar's Review. Thorsen teaches master's and doctoral classes and holds membership in such societies as the American Academy of Religion, Wesleyan Theological Society, and Oxford Institute.

Education 

 PhD, Theological and Religious Studies, Drew University
 M.Phil., Theological and Religious Studies, Drew University
 Th.M., Systematic Theology, Princeton Theological Seminary
 M.Div., Asbury Theological Seminary
 B.A., Religious Studies, Stanford University

Career 
Don Thorsen is Professor of Theology at Azusa Pacific University Seminary, located in Azusa, California. He promotes the Wesleyan Quadrilateral as a methodological complement—if not alternative—to the Protestant Reformation emphasis on Sola scriptura (Lat., "scripture alone"). Thorsen contrasts TULIP—the so-called five points of Calvinism—with ACURA, a Semi-Augustinian alternative acrostic (e.g., Arminianism, Wesleyanism): A = All are sinful; C = Conditional election; U = Unlimited atonement; R = Resistible Grace; and A = Assurance of salvation.

Thorsen also does ecumenical work with the National Council of Churches on the Theological Dialogue on Matters of Faith and Order Convening Table, and on Interreligious Relations and Collaboration. He also works ecumenically with the Wesleyan Holiness Connection. Thorsen served in editorial positions for Christianity Today and Christian Scholar's Review.

Books 
In addition to teaching, Thorsen has lectured around the world, and written numerous articles, book chapters, and books. His books include:

 What's True About Christianity? An Introduction to Christian Faith and Practice. Claremont, CA: Claremont Press, 2020. 
 An Exploration of Christian Theology, 2nd ed. (Baker Academic, 2020) .
 Pocket Dictionary of Christian Spirituality (InterVarsity, 2018) .
 Christian Ethics and Moral Philosophy: An Introduction to Issues and Approaches (Baker Academic, 2018), with Craig A. Boyd. .
 The Wesleyan Quadrilateral: An Introduction (Emeth Press, 2018). 
 Twelve Great Books that Changed the University (Cascade, 2014), with Steve Wilkens. .
 Strength to Be Holy (Emeth, 2014). .
 Calvin vs. Wesley: Bringing Belief in Line with Practice (Abingdon, 2013). 
 Unity in Mission: Theological Reflections on the Pilgrimage of Mission (Paulist, 2013), edited with Mitzi Budde. .
 Heart and Life: Rediscovering Holy Living (Aldersgate, 2012), edited with Barry Callen. .
 What Christians Believe about the Bible (Hendrickson, 2012), with Keith Reeves. .
 Everything You Know about Evangelicals Is Wrong (Well, Almost Everything) (Baker Academic, 2010), with Steve Wilkens. .
 The Holiness Manifesto (Eerdmans, 2008), edited with Kevin Mannoia. .
 An Exploration of Christian Theology (Hendrickson, 2008; rpt. Baker Academic, 2010). .
 Inclusive Language Handbook (Wesleyan/Holiness Women's Clergy, 1998), with Vickie Becker. 
 Theological Resources for Ministry (Evangel, 1996). .
 The Wesleyan Quadrilateral: Scripture, Tradition, Reason, and Experience as a Model of Evangelical Theology (Zondervan, 1990).

References 

1955 births
20th-century Protestant theologians
21st-century Protestant theologians
American Christian theologians
American evangelicals
Arminian theologians
Asbury Theological Seminary alumni
Drew University alumni
Living people
Princeton Theological Seminary alumni
Stanford University alumni